2,3,3,3-Tetrafluoropropene, HFO-1234yf, is a hydrofluoroolefin (HFO) with the formula CH2=CFCF3.
It is also designated R-1234yf as the first of a new class of refrigerants: it is marketed under the name Opteon YF by Chemours and as Solstice YF by Honeywell.

HFO-1234yf has a global warming potential (GWP) of less than 1, compared to 1,430 for R-134a and 1 for carbon dioxide.
This colorless gas is being used as a replacement for R-134a as a refrigerant in automobile air conditioners. As of 2022, 90% of new U.S. vehicles from original equipment manufacturers (OEMs) are estimated to use HFO-1234yf. One drawback is it breaks down into persistent organic pollutant short chain perfluorinated carboxylic acids (PFCAs).

Adoption by automotive industry
HFO-1234yf was developed by a team at DuPont, led by Barbara Haviland Minor, which worked jointly with researchers at Honeywell.  Their goal was to meet European directive 2006/40/EC, which went into effect in 2011 and required that all new car platforms for sale in Europe use a refrigerant in its AC system with a GWP below 150.

HFO-1234yf was initially considered to have a 100-year GWP of 4, and is now considered to have a 100-year GWP lower than 1. It can be used as a "near drop-in replacement" for R-134a, the product previously used in automobile AC systems, which has a 100-year GWP of 1430. This meant that automakers would not have to make significant modifications in assembly lines or in vehicle system designs to accommodate the product. HFO-1234yf had the lowest switching cost for automakers among the proposed alternatives. 
The product can be handled in repair shops in the same way as R-134a, although it requires some different, specialized equipment to perform the service. One of the reasons for that is the mild flammability of HFO-1234yf. Another issue affecting the compatibility between HFO-1234yf and R-134a-based systems is the choice of lubricating oil.

Shortly after confirmation from automakers that HFO-1234yf would be adopted as a replacement of R-134a automotive air-conditioning refrigerant, in 2010, Honeywell and DuPont announced that they would jointly build a manufacturing facility in Changshu, Jiangsu Province, China to produce HFO-1234yf. In 2017, Honeywell opened a new plant in Geismar, Louisiana, to produce the new refrigerant as well. Although others claim to be able to make and sell HFO-1234yf, Honeywell and DuPont hold most or all of the patents issued for HFO-1234yf and are considered the leading players in this area as of 2018.

Flammability
Although the product is classified slightly flammable by ASHRAE, several years of testing by SAE International proved that the product could not be ignited under conditions normally experienced by a vehicle. In addition, several independent authorities evaluated the safety of the product in vehicles and some of them concluded that it was as safe to use as R-134a, the product then in use in cars. In the atmosphere, HFO-1234yf degrades to trifluoroacetic acid, which is a mildly phytotoxic strong organic acid with no known biodegradation mechanism in water. In case of fire it releases highly corrosive and toxic hydrogen fluoride and the highly toxic gas carbonyl fluoride.

In July 2008, Honeywell and Du-Pont published a report claiming "HFO-1234yf is very difficult to ignite with electric spark", detailing the tests they did passing the gas over a hot plate heated to various temperatures in the range of 500–900 °C. Ignition was only seen when HFO-1234yf was mixed with PAG oil and passed over a plate that was >900 °C.

In August 2012, Mercedes-Benz showed that the substance ignited when researchers sprayed it and A/C compressor oil onto a car's hot engine. A senior Daimler engineer who ran the tests, stated "We were frozen in shock, I am not going to deny it. We needed a day to comprehend what we had just seen." Combustion occurred in more than two-thirds of their simulated head-on collisions. The engineers also noticed etching on the windshield caused by the corrosive gases. On September 25, 2012, Daimler issued a press release and proposed a recall of cars using the refrigerant. The German automakers argued for development of carbon dioxide refrigerants, which they argued would be safer.

In October 2012, SAE International established a new Cooperative Research Project, CRP1234-4, which included members of thirteen automotive companies, to extend its previous testing and investigate Daimler's claims. A preliminary update as of December 2012 and a final report publicly released on July 24, 2013 agreed that R-1234yf was safe to use in automotive direct-expansion air conditioning systems. R-1234yf was believed not to increase the estimated risk of vehicle fire exposure. The report further stated that "the refrigerant release testing completed by Daimler was unrealistic" and "created extreme conditions that favored ignition". The final report was supported by Chrysler/Fiat, Ford, General Motors, Honda, Hyundai, Jaguar Land Rover, Mazda, PSA, Renault and Toyota. Daimler, BMW and Audi chose to withdraw from the SAE R-1234yf CRP Team.

Following Mercedes' claims that the new refrigerant could be ignited, Germany's Kraftfahrt-Bundesamt (KBA, Federal Motor Transport Authority) conducted its own tests. They submitted a report to the European Union in August 2013. The Authority concluded that while R-1234yf was potentially more hazardous than previously used R-134a, it did not comprise a serious danger. Daimler disagreed with this conclusion and argued that the report supported their decision to continue to use older refrigerants.

On July 23, 2010, General Motors announced that it would introduce HFO-1234yf in 2013 Chevrolet, Buick, GMC, and Cadillac models in the U.S. Cadillac became the first American car to use R-1234yf in 2012.

Since then, Chrysler, 
GMC 
and Ford have all begun transitioning vehicles to R1234yf. Japanese automakers are also making the transition to R1234yf. Honda and Subaru began to introduce the new refrigerant with the 2017 models. From 2017 to 2018, BMW changed all of its models to R-1234yf. As of 2018, 50% of new vehicles from original equipment manufacturers (OEMs) are estimated to use R-1234yf.

Mixing HFO-1234yf with 10–11% R-134A is in development to produce a hybrid gas under review by ASHRAE for classification as A2L which is described as "virtually non-flammable". These gases are under review with the names of R451A and R451B. These mixes have GWP of ~147.

Other additives have been proposed for lowering the flammability of HFO-1234yf, such as trifluoroiodomethane, which has a low GWP due to its short atmospheric lifetime, but is slightly mutagenic.

Production
Typical methods for producing HFO-1234yf start with 1,2,3,3,3-pentafluoropropene.  Hydrogenation of this alkene gives 1,2,3,3,3-pentafluoropropane, which upon heating with an Al-based catalyst undergoes dehydrofluorination:
CF3CFHCFH2  →  CF3CF=CH2 + HF

See also
 1,3,3,3-Tetrafluoropropene (HFO-1234ze)

References

Haloalkenes
Organofluorides
Refrigerants
Automotive chemicals
Trifluoromethyl compounds